EBW may refer to:
Electron beam welding, a fusion welding process
Exploding bridgewire detonator, a device for detonating explosive charges 
European Bike Week, an annual event held at the Faaker See in Carinthia, Austria for fans of motorbikes
EBW (rail company) (also known as "EBW cargo"), a private rail cargo company based in Dachau,  Germany